Himba (Himbaka), also known as Simba, is a moribund Bantu language of Gabon.

References

Tsogo languages
Endangered languages of Africa
Endangered Niger–Congo languages